Barbara Lazović (née Varlec; born 4 January 1988) is a Slovenian handball player who plays as a right back for RK Krim and the Slovenian national team.

International honours
EHF Champions League:
Silver Medalist: 2017, 2018

Individual awards 
All-Star Right Back of the Romanian League: 2021

Personal life
She is the wife of the Montenegrin international Vuk Lazović.

References

External links

1988 births
Living people
Slovenian female handball players 
People from Brežice
Expatriate handball players
Slovenian expatriate sportspeople in Serbia
Slovenian expatriate sportspeople in North Macedonia
Slovenian expatriate sportspeople in Romania
Slovenian expatriate sportspeople in Montenegro